ZT's Blues is the fifth album by jazz saxophonist Stanley Turrentine recorded for the Blue Note label in 1961 but not released until 1985 and performed by Turrentine with Tommy Flanagan, Grant Green, Paul Chambers, and Art Taylor.

Reception
The Allmusic review by Michael Erlewine awarded the album 4½ stars stating "Green and Turrentine made few albums together, but the combination is a natural — the two greatest groove masters, bar none... If you can find a copy of this, it is a keeper".

Track listing
 "Z.T.'s Blues" (Turrentine) – 6:43
 "More Than You Know" (Edward Eliscu, Rose, Youmans) – 6:08
 "The Lamp Is Low" (DeRose, Parish, Ravel, Shefter) – 6:07
 "The Way You Look Tonight" (Fields, Kern) – 5:44
 "For Heaven's Sake" (Elise Bretton, Sherman Edwards, Donald Meyer) – 4:44
 "I Wish I Knew" (Gordon, Warren) – 5:34
 "Be My Love" (Brodszky, Cahn) – 5:13

Personnel
Stanley Turrentine – tenor saxophone
Tommy Flanagan – piano
Grant Green – guitar
Paul Chambers – bass
Art Taylor – drums

References

Stanley Turrentine albums
Blue Note Records albums
Albums produced by Alfred Lion
1985 albums
Albums recorded at Van Gelder Studio